Varinder Singh Ghuman is an Indian professional bodybuilder and actor. Ghuman won Mr. India in 2009 and he was awarded 2nd place in Mr. Asia.

Career

Bodybuilding
Ghuman hails from Gurdaspur, Punjab, and is the world's first vegetarian professional bodybuilder.

In 2009, Ghuman won Mr. India competition and secured second place in Mr. Asia. He was hired by Arnold Schwarzenegger for promoting his health products in Asia as his brand ambassador. He is the first Indian bodybuilder to secure the IFBB pro card.

Film
Ghuman appeared in the 2012 Punjabi film Kabaddi Once Again as the lead actor.

He made his Hindi film debut with the 2014 film Roar: Tigers of the Sundarbans. In 2019, Ghuman appeared in the Hindi film Marjaavaan.

Ghuman will be seen next in Kabir Khan directed Salman Khan starrer Tiger 3.

Filmography

References

External links
 
 Varinder Singh Ghuman complete profile

1980s births
Living people
Professional bodybuilders
Indian bodybuilders
Male actors in Hindi cinema
Male actors from Punjab, India
Sportspeople from Punjab, India